Jean Bénabou (1932 – 11 February 2022) was a Moroccan-born French mathematician, known for his contributions to category theory.

He directed the Research Seminar in Category Theory at the Institut Henri Poincaré and Institut de mathématiques de Jussieu from 1969 to 2001. Bénabou died on 11 February 2022.

Partial bibliography

See also

References

1932 births
2022 deaths
20th-century French mathematicians
Category theorists
Moroccan emigrants to France
People from Rabat

External links